The 1980 Lombard regional election took place on 8 June 1980. The 3rd term of the Regional Council was chosen.

Electoral law 
Election was held under proportional representation with provincial constituencies where the largest remainder method with a Droop quota was used. To ensure more proportionality, remained votes and seats were transferred at regional level and calculated at-large.

Results
The Christian Democracy party was by far the largest. After the election the incumbent president Giuseppe Guzzetti was re-elected at the head of a center-left coalition comprising also the PSI, the PSDI and the PRI.
<onlyinclude>
<noinclude>
Source: Ministry of the Interior

Seats by province

1980 elections in Italy
Regional elections in Lombardy